Herbert Howe may refer to:
 Herbert Howe (journalist), Hollywood news writer
 Herbert Alonzo Howe, American astronomer and educator
 S. Herbert Howe, Massachusetts businessman and politician
 Herb Howe, American psychologist and educationist